The 42nd edition of the annual Vuelta a Venezuela was held from August 29 to September 11, 2005. The stage race started in Guanare, and ended in Carúpano.

Final classification

References
cyclingnews

Vuelta a Venezuela
Venezuela
Vuelta Venezuela